Güzbulak is a village in the Tercan District, Erzincan Province, Turkey. The village is populated by Kurds of the Aşûran and Lolan tribes and had a population of 133 in 2021.

The hamlets of Alancık, Hasbey, İbrahim and Koyunlu are attached to the village.

References 

Villages in Tercan District
Kurdish settlements in Erzincan Province